Pedro Rocha Neves (born 1 October 1994), known as Pedro Rocha, is a Brazilian footballer who plays as a forward for Fortaleza.

Club career

Early career
Born in Vila Velha, Espírito Santo, Pedro Rocha started his career in an Atlético Mineiro academy in his hometown, before attracting the interest of São Paulo. In 2008, aged 13, he joined the latter, but was released just months later.

In 2011 Pedro Rocha joined Juventus-SP, after a partnership with Diadema. With the club he made his senior debut on 20 March 2013, starting in a 3–2 Campeonato Paulista Série A2 away win against Santo André, and scoring a brace through two penalties.

Grêmio
On 12 March 2014 Pedro Rocha moved to Grêmio on loan until the end of the year, being initially assigned to the under-20s. On 7 January 2015 he was bought outright, and was subsequently promoted to the main squad by manager Luiz Felipe Scolari.

Pedro Rocha made his Série A debut on 16 May 2015, starting in a 0–2 away loss against Coritiba. He scored his first goal in the category on 27 June, netting the first in a 2–1 win at Avaí; it was also the fastest of the tournament, with only 37 seconds.

Pedro Rocha scored a brace in the first leg of the 2016 Copa do Brasil Finals against Atlético Mineiro, but was subsequently sent off.

Spartak Moscow
On 31 August 2017, he signed with the Russian Premier League champions FC Spartak Moscow.

Loan to Cruzeiro
On 2 April 2019, Cruzeiro announced the signing of the player on loan until the end of the year.

Loan to Flamengo
On 24 December 2019, Spartak announced that Rocha will join Flamengo on loan until the end of 2020 with a purchase option.

Return to Spartak
On 13 January 2021, Spartak confirmed that Rocha returned to the club as his loan ended. On 24 February 2021, following the return of Quincy Promes to Spartak, Rocha was removed from Spartak's RPL squad as he was deemed the surplus foreign player by the club (Russian clubs were only allowed to register 8 foreign players at the same time). The club was hoping to sell his rights permanently. He was added to the second-tier FNL squad Spartak-2 Moscow on the same day. He was not registered for Spartak's league roster for the 2021–22 season either.

Loan to Athletico Paranaense
On 13 August 2021, Spartak announced a new loan to Athletico Paranaense for a one-year term. If he played in predetermined number of games during the loan, Athletico Paranaense would hold an obligation to purchase his rights.

Fortaleza
On 11 August 2022, Rocha joined Fortaleza until the end of 2023.

Career statistics

Honours
Grêmio
Copa do Brasil: 2016

Cruzeiro
Campeonato Mineiro: 2019

Flamengo
Recopa Sudamericana: 2020
Supercopa do Brasil: 2020
Campeonato Carioca: 2020

Athletico Paranaense
Copa Sudamericana: 2021

References

External links

1994 births
Living people
People from Vila Velha
Brazilian footballers
Association football forwards
Campeonato Brasileiro Série A players
Russian Premier League players
Russian First League players
Clube Atlético Juventus players
Grêmio Foot-Ball Porto Alegrense players
FC Spartak Moscow players
Cruzeiro Esporte Clube players
CR Flamengo footballers
FC Spartak-2 Moscow players
Club Athletico Paranaense players
Fortaleza Esporte Clube players
Brazilian expatriate footballers
Brazilian expatriate sportspeople in Russia
Expatriate footballers in Russia
Sportspeople from Espírito Santo